Ayaskent (former Ayasili and Ayasköy) is a town in Bergama district of İzmir Province, Turkey. Ayaskent (then known as Ayasili) was founded during the Ottoman Empire era. In 1976 Ayaskent was declared a seat of township. Main economic activities are agriculture and light industry based on agriculture. Dairy, flour factories, olive press and a cottom gin are some of the industrial  workshops of the town.

References

Populated places in İzmir Province
İzmir Province
Towns in Turkey
Bergama District